Northwich is a civil parish and a town in Cheshire West and Chester, England. It contains 35 buildings that are recorded in the National Heritage List for England as designated listed buildings.  Two of these are listed at Grade I, the highest grade, and the rest at the lowest grade, Grade II; none are listed at the middle grade, Grade II*.  The River Dane joins the River Weaver and the Weaver Navigation within the parish.  Also passing through the parish are the A533 road, the Trent and Mersey Canal, and a railway built by the Cheshire Lines Committee.  Many of the listed buildings are associated with these features.

Listed buildings that were originally designed for domestic use but later converted for other purposes include Winnington Hall, and Hartford Manor.  Buildings still in domestic use include Rose Cottage, Cassantree, and the cottages at 256–268 London Road.  There are three listed churches, the Anglican churches of St Helen, together with the sundial in its churchyard, and Holy Trinity, and the Roman Catholic Church of St Wilfrid.  Three swing bridges crossing the Weaver Navigation, together with their control cabins, are listed, namely the Hayhurst Bridge, the Town Bridge, and the Winnington Turn Bridge.  Other structures associated with the Weaver Navigation are Hunt's Locks, and Navigation House with its former stables.  Associated with the Trent and Mersey Canal is one of its mileposts.  The railway viaduct built for the Cheshire Lines Committee is listed.  Other listed structures include the gates and gate piers of Verdin Park, the original part of the Victoria Infirmary, and the former Plaza Cinema.  In addition the statues of Ludwig Mond and Sir John Brunner, the founders of the chemical firm of Brunner Mond, standing in front of the research laboratories of Winnington Works, are listed.  The extraction of salt caused subsidence in the town towards the end of the 19th century, and buildings were designed so that they could be lifted in the event of further subsidence.  Some of these are listed, namely the Brunner Public Library, the R. A. O. B. Hall, and the Post Office.

Key

Buildings

References
Citations

Sources

 

Listed buildings in Cheshire West and Chester
Lists of listed buildings in Cheshire
Northwich